Heliocypha is a genus of jewel damselflies in the family Chlorocyphidae. There are about nine described species in Heliocypha, found in Indomalaya.

Species
These nine species belong to the genus Heliocypha:
 Heliocypha angusta (Hagen in Selys, 1853)
 Heliocypha biforata (Selys, 1859)
 Heliocypha biseriata (Selys, 1859)
 Heliocypha bisignata (Hagen in Selys, 1853)
 Heliocypha fenestrata (Wiedemann in Burmeister, 1839)
 Heliocypha mariae (Lieftinck, 1930)
 Heliocypha nubecula (Lieftinck, 1948)
 Heliocypha perforata (Percheron, 1835) (Common Blue Jewel)
 Heliocypha vantoli Hämäläinen, 2016

References

Further reading

 
 

Chlorocyphidae